Maurice Pierre Auguste Martin (1878–1952) was a French soldier and general in the French army during World War II.

He is also notable for requesting that the United States government freeze all Japanese assets in the United States, after Japan invaded French Indochina in September 1940.

Battles
 Pacific War
 Japanese invasion of French Indochina

References

External links
Generals of World War II

French Army generals of World War II
1878 births
1952 deaths
French generals